Ceylalictus capverdensis is a species of sweat bees of the family Halictidae. It is endemic to Cape Verde. The species was described in 2002.

References

Halictidae
Insects described in 2002
Insects of Cape Verde